Maurizio Felugo (born 4 March 1981) is an Italian male water polo player. He was a member of the Italy men's national water polo team, playing as a driver.

Biography
Born at Rapallo, he currently plays for Pro Recco and the Italian water polo national team as a defender. Felugo debuted in the youth team of Chiavari Nuoto, and in 1998 he was acquired by Rari Nantes Savona. During his stay there, he received his first cap with the Italian national team. Moving to  Posillipo after five years,  he won there the Italian top division title and a LEN Euroleague. He is 1.89m and weighs 82 kg.

In 2006 he moved to Pro Recco. He won the gold medal at the 2011 FINA World Aquatics Championships in Shanghai.

He was part of the Italian team that won the silver medal at the 2012 Summer Olympics.

See also
 Italy men's Olympic water polo team records and statistics
 List of Olympic medalists in water polo (men)
 List of men's Olympic water polo tournament top goalscorers
 List of world champions in men's water polo
 List of World Aquatics Championships medalists in water polo

References 
 Page at Italy's 2008 Olympic team website

External links
 

1981 births
Living people
People from Rapallo
Italian male water polo players
Water polo drivers
Water polo players at the 2004 Summer Olympics
Water polo players at the 2008 Summer Olympics
Water polo players at the 2012 Summer Olympics
Medalists at the 2012 Summer Olympics
Olympic silver medalists for Italy in water polo
World Aquatics Championships medalists in water polo
Sportspeople from the Province of Genoa
20th-century Italian people
21st-century Italian people